Anna & Elizabeth are an Americana/folk music duo formed by Anna Roberts-Gevalt and Elizabeth Laprelle, integrating experimental music with authentic performances of folk songs from both the north and south of the US.

Elizabeth LaPrelle is a banjo player and singer from Cedar Springs, Virginia. She graduated from the College of William and Mary, specializing in traditional Appalachian singing and has three solo albums, apart from her work with Anna and Elizabeth. Anna Roberts-Gevalt is a multi-instrumentalist who was raised in Hinesburg and attended Champlain Valley Union High School. She played violin and viola for the Vermont Youth Orchestra.

The two met in 2010 and have released so far three albums together. Their first album Sun to Sun, was originally released in 2013, and was re-released in 2016. Their 2015 self-titled first album was released on Free Dirt Records in 2015. Their second album, the invisible comes to us, released in 2018, integrates authentic folk music extracted from archives in the Virginia Center for the Creative Arts and at the Macdowell Colony in Peterborough, New Hampshire, among others. The album integrates folk music with electronic sounds and sonic experiments. Their third album was received with critical acclaim.

In 2019, Elizabeth LaPrelle made her acting debut, costarring in the award-winning film The Mountain Minor as a young Eastern Kentucky woman during the Great Depression.

References

External links 
 https://folkways.si.edu/artists/anna-elizabeth

American folk musical groups
21st-century American musicians